Rob Clerc (born 9 August 1955) is a Dutch draughts player. In 1976 he tied for second place at the Draughts World Championship. He was second place at the 1992 European championship held in Parthenay.

References 

1955 births
Living people
Dutch draughts players
Players of international draughts
Sportspeople from Amsterdam